Basque Country women's national rugby union team (Basque: Euskadiko emakumeen selekzioa) is the national and/or representative women's rugby union team of the Basque Country. It is organised by the Basque Rugby Federation and has been active since 1994–95. Unlike the men's team, the Basque Country women's team have only played a small number of international games. They regularly play friendlies against club and provincial teams.

History

Competitions
Since 1994–95 the Basque Country women's team have competed in the Spanish Regions Championship featuring other women's teams representing the autonomous communities of Spain. This competition is organised by the Spanish Rugby Federation. Since 2006–07 they have also competed in the Pyrenees International Tournament.

List of results

Notes
  Spanish Regions Championship final
  Pyrenees International Tournament final

Honours
Spanish Regions Championship
Winners: 2001–02, 2005–06, 2007–08, 2008–09, 2009–10: 5   
Runners-up:  2002–03, 2003–04, 2010–11: 3
Pyrenees International Tournament
Winners: 2008–09, 2009–10: 2 
Runners-up: 2006–07, 2010–11 : 2

Players

2016 squad
Squad called up for the friendly match against France U20 on 6 February 2016.

Head coach: José Miguel Galdós

internationals

internationals
 Lise Arricastre 
 Ana Ayerra
 Patricia Carricaburu
 Céline Ferer
 Céline Héguy
 Danièle Irazu
 Sandrine Jauregiberri
 Julie Pujol

See also
 Basque Country national rugby union team
 France women's national rugby union team
 Spain women's national rugby union team

References

Women's national rugby union teams
rugby union
Rugby union in the Basque Country (greater region)
Women's rugby union in Spain
1994 establishments in Spain